The Inner Holm of Skaw is a small, uninhabited islet off the northern tip of the island of Whalsay, in the Shetland Islands of Scotland, north of the village of Skaw.

Location

A kayaker may find their way through the rocks between the islet and the headland of Skaw Taing on Whalsay.
Further out to sea there is another rocky islet, the Outer Holm of Skaw.
The islet has a ruined chapel.
In 1955 a pair of Sandwich terns nested on the islet.

See also
 Holm of Skaw
 Outer Holm of Skaw

Gallery

References
Citations

Sources

Islets of Whalsay
Uninhabited islands of Shetland